Troian Avery Bellisario (born October 28, 1985) is an American actress. A graduate of the University of Southern California, in 2010, she received her breakthrough role as Spencer Hastings in the Freeform drama series Pretty Little Liars (20102017), for which she received worldwide recognition and multiple awards and nominations.

Early life
Bellisario was born and raised in Los Angeles. Her parents are producers Deborah Pratt and Donald P. Bellisario, her father having created Magnum, P.I., Quantum Leap, and NCIS, among other TV series. She has a younger brother, three half-sisters, two half-brothers, and two stepbrothers, actor Sean Murray and producer Chad W. Murray. Her father is of Italian and Serbian descent, and her mother is of African American and Creole descent.

Attending Campbell Hall School in Studio City, California, from kindergarten through twelfth grade, Bellisario was the valedictorian of her class. After high school, she attended Vassar College for several months before taking a break for the sake of her mental health, feeling that the institution only enhanced her perfectionist tendencies. She graduated with a Bachelor of Fine Arts degree from the University of Southern California in 2009.

Career

Early work
Bellisario made her acting debut in the 1988 film Last Rites at the age of three, which was directed, written and produced by her father, Donald P. Bellisario. In 1990, she guest-starred in an episode of her father's series Quantum Leap. In 1998, she co-starred with Mary-Kate and Ashley Olsen in the film Billboard Dad. Beginning in 2006, Bellisario began appearing in a number of independent short films namely, Unspoken, Archer House and Intersect.

2010s
In November 2009, Bellisario was cast as Spencer Hastings in the TV series Pretty Little Liars based on the book series of the same name by Sara Shepard. In October 2011, Bellisario announced she was in the process of writing and creating her own film, which was successfully funded through Kickstarter on November 16, 2011. Filming ended in December 2011 and the film was officially completed by August 2012.

In 2014, she starred in the music video for The Head and the Heart's song "Another Story". Bellisario also starred in Immediately Afterlife, a short film about two cult members who are the only survivors of their group's mass suicide, playing Bennett, alongside her Pretty Little Liars co-stars Shay Mitchell (Emily), Ian Harding (Ezra Fitz) and Nolan North (Peter Hastings). In 2015, she was cast in a leading role in the American remake of the French-Canadian film Martyrs. In 2015, Bellisario and fiancée Patrick J. Adams filmed the short film We Are Here in Haida Gwaii, which Bellisario wrote and starred in. In 2017, Bellisario starred in her feature film, Feed, which she also wrote and produced. The film was written based on Bellisario's own experiences with an eating disorder.

On April 7, 2016, it was announced that Bellisario would be directing season 7, episode 15 of Pretty Little Liars. This made her one of the first in the cast, alongside Chad Lowe, to direct an episode on the series. In 2020, Bellisario appeared as the bride character Jenna Marshall from the episode "Til Dex Do Us Part" in Stumptown.

Further in television, she costarred with Australian actress Jacki Weaver in the television drama film Sister Cities (2016), and opposite Bradley Whitford in the Me Too drama Lauren (20122013). In film, Bellisario has received recognition for her performances in C.O.G. (2013), Feed (2017), Clara (2018) and Where'd You Go, Bernadette (2019).

2020s
In March 2020, Bellisario played the lead role of Claire in the CBS political drama pilot Ways & Means, written by Ed Redlich. The pilot, which also starred Patrick Dempsey, focused on a secret alliance between a disillusioned career politician and an idealist up-and-comer in the gridlocked American system. The show was not picked up.

In 2022, she appeared in the comedy Doula alongside Arron Shiver (who also wrote the film) and Will Greenberg. The film, produced by Chris Pine and directed by Cheryl Nichols, deals with Bellisario's character hiring her midwife's son as the latter's replacement when she passes away.

Personal life
Bellisario started dating Suits star Patrick J. Adams after they met on the set of the play Equivocation in 2009. The couple briefly split, but after Adams' guest appearance as Hardy in Pretty Little Liars, in 2010, the two got back together. Since working on Equivocation and Pretty Little Liars, the couple also worked together on the 2012 short film The Come Up, Suits, and the short film We Are Here. Bellisario and Adams were married on December 10, 2016, in Santa Barbara, California. In May 2018, they attended the royal wedding of Prince Harry and Meghan Markle. The couple has two daughters, born in 2018 and 2021.

In an episode of actress Katie Lowes's podcast, Katie's Crib, Bellisario and Adams said their second child was born in the backseat of their car at the hospital parking lot due to an accelerated labour, with Adams delivering the baby. Hospital staff assisted within minutes of the delivery, and Bellisario and the baby were found healthy.

Bellisario said in January 2014 that she endured personal problems during high school, resulting in self-harm and an eating disorder. "I was the youngest daughter, the perfect little girl. My school was a very intense college prep school. So it was about wanting to please my father and mother and wanting to be perfect to everybody."

In 2014, Bellisario returned to her alma mater, USC School of Dramatic Arts, delivering the commencement speech.

Filmography

Film

Television

Radio

Web

Music videos

Director

Awards and nominations

References

External links

 
 

1985 births
Living people
20th-century American actresses
21st-century American actresses
Actresses from Los Angeles
American child actresses
American film actresses
American people of Italian descent
American people of Serbian descent
American people of French descent
American people of English descent
American people of Creole descent
African-American actresses
American television actresses
USC School of Dramatic Arts alumni
Bellisario family